Jessica Diamond (born June 6, 1957) is an American conceptual artist who is known for her wall drawings and installations. She has explored themes of anti-commercialism, social and sexual roles in her artworks.

Diamond was born in New York, New York. She received her BFA from the School of Visual Arts in 1979 and her MFA from Columbia University in 1981. She has exhibited her work globally since 1983. She did a series of wall drawings influenced by and responding to the work of Japanese artist Yayoi Kusama.

Her work is in the collection of the Whitney Museum of American Art and MoMA.

References

Further reading 
 Moos, David, and Jessica Diamond. Jessica Diamond. Toronto: Art Gallery of York University, 2001. Print.
 Pakesch, Peter, and Inge Scholz-Strasser. Freud and Contemporary Art: The Collection of the Sigmund Freud Museum, Vienna : April 25-July 8, 2006. New York: Austrian Cultural Forum, New York, 2006. Print.
 Schaffner, Ingrid, Bennett Simpson, and Tanya Leighton. The Big Nothing. Philadelphia, PA: Institute of Contemporary Art, 2004. Print.
 Felix, Zdenek. Das Jahrhundert Des Multiple: Von Duchamp Bis Zur Gegenwart. Stuttgart: Oktagon Verlag, 1994. Print.

American conceptual artists
Women conceptual artists
Columbia University School of the Arts alumni
School of Visual Arts alumni
1957 births
Living people
21st-century American women artists